Ginga is the middleware specification for the Nipo-Brazilian Digital Television System (SBTVD, from the Portuguese Sistema Brasileiro de Televisão Digital). Ginga is also ITU-T Recommendation for IPTV Services. It is also considered in ITU-T recommendations for Cable Broadcast services (ITU-T J.200 Recommendation series: Rec. ITU-T J.200, Rec. ITU-T J.201 and Rec. ITU-T J.202) and for Terrestrial Broadcast services by ITU-R BT.1889, ITU-R BT.1699 and ITU-R BT.1722. Ginga was developed based on a set of standardized technologies but mainly on innovations developed by Brazilian researchers. Its current reference implementation was released under the GPL license.

Ginga is divided into two main integrated subsystems, which allow the development of applications following two different programming paradigms. Those subsystems are called Ginga-NCL (for declarative NCL applications) and Ginga-J (for imperative Java applications).

In the case of the Brazilian Terrestrial Digital TV System, and any other Digital TV Systems following the definitions in the ABNT standards for the Ginga Middleware ABNT 15606, Ginga-J is required to be supported in fixed receivers and it is optional in portable receivers. For IPTV services following the H.761 ITU-T Recommendation, only the Ginga-NCL subsystem is required, for any terminal type.

Development

Ginga was developed by Telemídia Lab from Pontifical Catholic University of Rio de Janeiro (PUC-Rio) and by LAViD from Federal University of Paraíba (UFPB).

See also 
 Nested Context Language
 Broadcast Markup Language

References

External links
Ginga Official Web Site
 Ginga NCL and Ginga Communities
Ginga Community at "Software Público Brasileiro"
NCL (Nested Context Language)
Ginga Code Development Network (Portuguese language)
Intel and Sun will develop Ginga-J in Brazil (16 March 2009)
ITU passed Ginga, NexTV Latam (6 April 2010)
Telemídia Lab
LAViD
tmira solutions Ginga broadcast server and Ginga iTV browser.
Brazil invested US$27 million in five years (between 2005 and 2010)  to develop interactive TV
Fujitsu launches DTT STBs with Ginga, NexTV Latam (4 March 2011)
Brazil wants to reach 2015 with the 100% of TV set fitted with Ginga, NexTV Latam (14 November 2011)
Brazil prepares its Ginga pilot run with return channel, NexTV Latam (14 February 2012)
Argentina launches interactive TV soccer app, TV Pública Digital (Argentina), NexTV Latam  (8 March 2012)
Venezuela tests free software apps for DTT, NexTV Latam (22 Aug. 2012)
, ABNT NBR 15606-1
, SBTVD Forum - Digital TV Standards
, Rec. ITU-T J.200
, Rec. ITU-T J.201
, Rec. ITU-T J.202
, ITU-R BT.1889
, ITU-R BT.1699
, ITU-R BT.1722
Ginga-J: The Procedural Middleware for the Brazilian Digital TV System 
Official page for Ginga
Intel and Sun will develop Ginga-J in Brazil (16 March 2009)

Others links
 , User Group Ginga-DF (Ginga Distrito Federal - BR)

Digital television
Interactive television
Free software
Brazilian inventions
Middleware
Digital television software
ISDB